Djamel Mastouri (born 17 January 1972) is a Paralympian athlete from France competing mainly in category T37 middle-distance events.

He competed in the 2008 Summer Paralympics in Beijing, China.  There he won a bronze medal in the men's 800 metres - T37 event.

References

External links

 
 

1972 births
Living people
Paralympic athletes of France
Paralympic bronze medalists for France
Athletes (track and field) at the 2008 Summer Paralympics
Medalists at the 2008 Summer Paralympics
Paralympic medalists in athletics (track and field)
French male middle-distance runners
20th-century French people
21st-century French people